The Brotherhood is a 1968 Technicolor mafia crime film, directed by Martin Ritt. It stars Kirk Douglas, Irene Papas, Alex Cord, and Luther Adler. The script was by Lewis John Carlino. Released by Paramount Pictures, while the film received mixed to positive reviews, the film bombed at the box office, with Paramount deciding not to produce another gangster film until it made The Godfather four years later.

Plot
A young American man arrives in Palermo by plane. A taxi driver at the airport immediately gets word to Frank Ginetta (Kirk Douglas), who hides, armed with a gun, until he realizes that the visitor he's been warned about is actually his younger brother Vinnie (Alex Cord).

Frank happily welcomes his brother and takes him home, catching up on old times. But his wife, Ida (Irene Papas), reminds him that "they're going to send someone," suggesting that perhaps Vinnie is the one.

In a flashback, Frank recalls better times in New York City, beginning with Vinnie's homecoming from military service and subsequent marriage to Emma Bertolo (Susan Strasberg). The father of the bride, Dominick Bertolo (Luther Adler) is a Mafia don, as is the groom's brother, Frank. And among those paying their respects as guests at the wedding are mob leaders like Egan (Murray Hamilton), Rotherman (Val Avery) and Levin (Alan Hewitt), who are the equals of Frank and Dominick in the New York region's organized crime.

These capos within the Organization meet as a board to coordinate their business. The majority becomes increasingly unhappy with Frank's position, as he seems opposed to every new idea. Frank also dispenses justice on his own in the old Sicilian fashion, without seeking approval from the others. They, not being of Sicilian origin, are trying to leave behind the old traditional methods, such as when two of Frank's hit men kill a stool pigeon in the marshes and leave him tied to a chair with a canary stuffed in his mouth, as a warning to others who might talk too much.

Frank still fondly remembers his father, who also was a mafioso who was assassinated in a hit. Vinnie is more of a businessman, and takes sides with the other board members in ventures they intend to pursue without his brother. Frank resents this, striking Vinnie for defying him and insisting to the board that Vinnie will have no part in what they have planned.

Older members of the organization who are no longer involved in decision-making tell Frank that it was Dom Bertolo who made it possible for outsiders to spot and find members of their Mafia family, resulting in 41 murders, Frank's father included. Bertolo had taken up outside of the family 35 years earlier with Irish and Jewish outsiders who wanted to get in the Mafia, and by doing so secured his own power in the larger, expanded outfit against older members like Frank's father. Frank is conflicted because Bertolo is his brother's father in law, but the Sicilian code of honor decides what he must do. Pretending to reconcile with Dominick for past differences, he offers to submit to the new deal, while in reality he is taking him to a deserted warehouse to be executed. As he realizes what his fate is, a terrified Dominick collapses from heart failure.

Frank hides out in Sicily, but knows his days are numbered and that the Board plans to have him killed. Realizing that it is Vinnie who has been forced under threats by Egan to do the job of killing him, Frank bitterly accepts this fate in the hope that it will save his brother's life and that of his family back in America. Vinnie realizes at last that he has been played like a puppet all along against his well-meaning brother, who in order to protect him lays down his own life, handing Vinnie their father's shotgun with which to shoot him.

Cast

See also
List of American films of 1968

References

External links
 
 
 
 
 

1968 crime drama films
1968 films
American crime drama films
Films about the American Mafia
Films about the Sicilian Mafia
Films directed by Martin Ritt
Films set in Sicily
Films shot in New York City
Paramount Pictures films
Films scored by Lalo Schifrin
Films with screenplays by Lewis John Carlino
1960s English-language films
1960s American films